Polaromonas naphthalenivorans is a Gram-negative, oxidase- and catalase-positive, non-spore-forming, nonmotile bacterium from the genus Polaromonas, which was isolated from coal-tar contaminated freshwater sediment. P. naphthalenivorans has the ability to degrade naphthalene. Its colonies have a smooth and glistening surface.

References

External links
Type strain of Polaromonas naphthalenivorans at BacDive -  the Bacterial Diversity Metadatabase

Comamonadaceae
Bacteria described in 2004